Braunschweig (German Regierungsbezirk Braunschweig) was one of the eight former administrative regions (Regierungsbezirke) of Lower Saxony, Germany. It was located in the southeast of the state.

The region covers roughly the area of the former state of Brunswick-Lüneburg. It was founded in 1978 out of 'Verwaltungsbezirk Braunschweig'. At the end of 2004, all Regierungsbezirke of Lower Saxony were dissolved.

The other seven were Regierungsbezirk Aurich, Regierungsbezirk Hannover, Regierungsbezirk Hildesheim, Regierungsbezirk Lüneburg, Regierungsbezirk Osnabrück, Regierungsbezirk Stade and Regierungsbezirk Weser-Ems. 'Verwaltungsbezirk Oldenburg' was dissolved in June 1977 and became part of Regierungsbezirk Weser-Ems.

The region of Braunschweig was (2005/6) the most R&D-intensive area in the whole European Economic Area investing 7.1% of its GDP for research & technology.

Districts from 1978 to 2004

Kreise(districts)
 Gifhorn
 Goslar
 Göttingen
 Helmstedt
 Northeim
 Osterode
 Peine
 Wolfenbüttel

Kreisfreie Städte(district-free towns)
 Braunschweig (Brunswick)
 Salzgitter
 Wolfsburg

References  

Geography of Lower Saxony
Former states and territories of Lower Saxony
History of Brunswick
States and territories established in 1978
States and territories disestablished in 2004
1978 establishments in Germany
2004 disestablishments in Germany
Former government regions of Germany